Trachycystis lamellifera is a species of gastropod belonging to the family Charopidae.

The species is found in East Africa.

References

Charopidae
Gastropods described in 1903